Scott McKenzie Murdoch (born 27 February 1969) was a Scottish footballer who played 'senior' for Clydebank, Dumbarton and Albion Rovers.

References

1969 births
Scottish footballers
Dumbarton F.C. players
Clydebank F.C. (1965) players
Albion Rovers F.C. players
Scottish Football League players
Living people
Association football midfielders